Sonnie Trotter (born November 15, 1979, in Toronto), is a Canadian professional climber, known for his strength in many rock climbing disciplines, contributing to hundreds of first ascents around the world.

Climbing career
Trotter began climbing in 1997 at age 16 and became the first Canadian to climb grade 5.14c, and the third North American to have established a 5.14d route. In 2006, he made Squamish history when he and his climbing partner Matt Segal connected The Shadow (5.13b), The Grand Wall (5.13b), and The Black Dyke (5.13b), on the Stawamus Chief all free in a single 12-hour push.

Personal
He currently works at Elevation Place in Canmore, Alberta. He lives in Canmore with his wife and son.

Filmography
'Trotter has been featured in three award-winning films. "The Cobra Crack", won the best short film at the BIMFF in 2006. "If you're not falling" won Best Short Film at BIMFF in 2008 and "First Ascent" is the winner of multiple awards. Trotter is also prominently featured in the opening scenes of the hit motion picture 'The Twilight Saga: Breaking Dawn - Part 2' being chased by Bella while free soloing."

Notable ascents

Traditional routes

 The Prophet (5.13d R), November 2011, El Capitan. First repeat with Will Stanhope of Leo Houlding's 2010 traditional climbing route.

 Rhapsody (5.14c X, E11 7a), June 2008, Dumbarton, Scotland. First repeat of Dave MacLeod's famous traditional climbing route, world's first E11.

 The Path (5.14a R, E10/11), August 2007, Lake Louise, Alberta.  First free ascent having chopped the bolts off an abandoned sport climb project.

  (5.14b, E9), June 2006, Squamish, British Columbia. First free ascent of one of the world's hardest and most coveted crack climbs; first ascended as aid climbing route (A2) by Peter Croft in the 1980s.

 East Face (Monkey Face) (5.13d R), 2004, Smith Rocks. First ascent to use only traditional climbing gear on Alan Watts' sport climbing route.

Sport routes

 Estado Critico (5.14d), April 7, 2015, Oliana, Spain.
 Forever Expired (5.14d, FA in 2004) Ontario's hardest route to date
 Necessary Evil , March 2003, Virgin River Gorge, Arizona. Repeat of Chris Sharma's famous 1997 route, the first 5.14c in America.
 Superman (5.14c), 2002, Cheakamus Canyon, Squamish. First ascent of a link-up of several existing routes.
 Just Do It (5.14c)
 Sugar Daddy (soft 5.14a, FA in 2010), Nightmare Rock, Squamish BC.
 Ewbank Route, Totem Pole (5.12d R in 2015), free ascent of the original aid line on Tasmania's iconic sea column (climbed in one pitch).

Boulder routes

 The Proposal , Squamish, British Columbia
 The Egg , Squamish, British Columbia

See also 
History of rock climbing
List of first ascents (sport climbing)
Dave MacLeod, Scottish traditional climber
Johnny Dawes, British traditional climber

References

External links
 Sonnie Trotter Squamish Guides Profile
 VIDEO: Sonnie Trotter's 2006 FA of the Notorious Cobra Crack, Climbing (June 2020}
 VIDEO: Watch Sonnie Trotter Climb The Path 5.14R, Gripped Magazine (May 2015)

1979 births
Living people
Canadian rock climbers
Sportspeople from Toronto